The Harvard Lampoon is an undergraduate humor publication founded in 1876 by seven undergraduates at Harvard University in Cambridge, Massachusetts.

Overview
The Harvard Lampoon publication was founded in 1876 by seven undergraduates at Harvard University in Cambridge, Massachusetts who were inspired by popular magazines like Punch (1841) and Puck (1871). The Harvard Lampoon is the world's third longest-running continually published humor magazine, after the Swedish Blandaren (1863) and the Swiss Nebelspalter (1875).

The organization also produces occasional humor books (the best known being the 1969 J. R. R. Tolkien parody Bored of the Rings) and parodies of national magazines such as Entertainment Weekly and Sports Illustrated. Much of the organization's capital is provided by the licensing of the "Lampoon" name to National Lampoon, begun by Harvard Lampoon graduates in 1970.

The Lampoon publishes five issues annually. In 2006, the Lampoon began regularly releasing content on its website, including pieces from the magazine and web-only content.  In 2009, the Lampoon published a parody of Twilight called Nightlight, which is a New York Times bestseller. In February 2012, the Lampoon released a parody of The Hunger Games called The Hunger Pains, also a New York Times bestseller.

The Lampoon is housed a few blocks from Harvard Square in a mock-Flemish castle, the Harvard Lampoon Building. It has been ranked by the magazine Complex as the fifth most phallic building in the world.

History

The Harvard Lampoon was first published in 1876 by seven founders including Ralph Wormeley Curtis, Edward Sandford Martin, Edmund March Wheelwright, and Arthur Murray Sherwood (father of Robert E. Sherwood). The first issue of the Lampoon was a single copy, nailed to a tree in Harvard Yard. In its earliest years the magazine focused primarily on the satirization of Harvard and Boston Brahmin society. As the Lampoon began to gain notoriety on campus, the society moved from offices in Hollis Hall to addresses on Holyoke and Plympton streets respectively. These collections of rooms rented by the trustees of the Lampoon were famous not only for their beer nights, but also with the regularity that the Lampoon spent the profits made on each magazine for these beer nights. "It was a good night when the Lampoon could afford coal and beer, and they often had to choose between one or the other." Pranks abounded in the early years, some more destructive than others. William Randolph Hearst was expelled from Harvard after sending a pudding pot used as a chamber pot to a professor.

A Lampoon graduate from 1887, Archibald Cary Coolidge, professor of architecture at Harvard College, was chosen as the architect of Randolph Hall, one of the college's newest dormitories. Legend has it that when designing Randolph, Coolidge purposefully made the dormitory recessed further back from Mt. Auburn Street than was at first designed, purchasing for himself the land the Castle now stands on. The commission to design the castle was given to Edmund M. Wheelwright, then city architect of Boston.

The Lampoon and its sensibility began to branch out away from the Harvard campus in the early 1960s, and soon became an especially important expression and feeder system of American humor and comedy since that time. In 1961, Mademoiselle offered the Lampoon staff an honorarium to produce a parody of their own magazine for the traditionally lower-selling July issue. The project boosted Mademoiselle'''s summer circulation along with the Lampoons ever tenuous cash flow, and the magazine renewed its association with the Lampoon for a follow-up parody in July 1962, and a third parody issue (of Esquire) in July 1963.  The magazine also produced a 70-page spoof of Ian Fleming's James Bond novels in 1962 titled Alligator, which was subsequently released by Random House.  These projects proved popular, and led to full, nationally-distributed parodies of Playboy (1966), Time (1968), and Life (1969), and later, Cosmopolitan in 1972 and Sports Illustrated (1974).

An important line of demarcation came when Lampoon editors and National Lampoon co-founders Douglas Kenney and Henry Beard wrote the Tolkien parody Bored of the Rings. The success of this book and the attention it brought its authors led directly to the creation of the National Lampoon magazine. This in turn spun off a live show Lemmings, and then a radio show in the early 1970s, The National Lampoon Radio Hour, which featured such performers as Christopher Guest, Harry Shearer and Chevy Chase.

Writers from these shows were subsequently hired to help create Saturday Night Live.  This was the first in a line of many TV shows that Lampoon graduates went on to write for, including The Simpsons, Futurama, Late Night with David Letterman, Seinfeld, Friends, The League, NewsRadio, The Office, 30 Rock, Parks and Recreation and dozens of others.  An old copy of the magazine was shown in the fourth-season finale of NewsRadio, and referred to as the "nefarious scandal sheet."

Lampoon alumni include such comedians as Conan O'Brien, Andy Borowitz, B. J. Novak, Greg Daniels, Michael Schur, Christopher Cerf (Sesame Street), and Colin Jost. Etan Cohen wrote for Beavis and Butt-Head as an undergraduate member. In 1986 former editor Kurt Andersen co-founded the satirical magazine Spy, which employed Lampoon writers Paul Simms and Eric Kaplan, and published the work of Lampoon alumni Patricia Marx, Lawrence O'Donnell and Mark O'Donnell. The Lampoon has also graduated many noted authors such as George Plimpton, George Santayana, John Updike, and William Gaddis.  Actor Fred Gwynne was a cartoonist and president of the Lampoon. Famous Boston lawyer Bradley Palmer acted as treasurer for the Lampoon.

Celebrities often visit the Lampoon to be inducted as honorary members of the organization. Honorary members   include Aerosmith, Winston Churchill, John Cleese, Bill Cosby, Billy Crystal, Tony Hawk, Hugh Hefner, Kesha, Jay Leno, Elon Musk, Ezra Pound, Adam Sandler, the cast of Saturday Night Live, Sarah Silverman, Tracey Ullman, Kurt Vonnegut, John Wayne and Robin Williams.

Rivalry with The Harvard Crimson

The Lampoon has a long-standing rivalry with Harvard's student newspaper, The Harvard Crimson, which repeatedly refers to the Lampoon in its pages as a "semi-secret Sorrento Square social organization which used to occasionally publish a so-called humor magazine".

The Lampoon–Crimson rivalry was furthered by the Crimson's 1953 theft of the Lampoon Castle's ibis statue and presentation of it as a gift to the government of the Soviet Union.

On September 27, 2011, the Lampoon stole the Harvard Crimson President's Chair, and had it used as a prop on Late Night with Jimmy Fallon. On June 2, 2015, the Lampoon again stole the Harvard Crimson President's Chair; this time, pretending that it was the Harvard Crimsons editorial staff, they took the chair to Trump Tower to fake endorsement for later-president Donald Trump.

 Notable members 

 Publications Alligator (1962)Bored of the Rings (1969)The Hunger Pains'' (2012)

Gallery

References

External links

 Harvard Lampoon (1876–) at HathiTrust Digital Library
  – six as "(Organization)" and one as "(Cambridge, Massachusetts), author"

 
1876 establishments in Massachusetts
College humor magazines
Collegiate secret societies
Lampoon
Magazines established in 1876
Magazines published in Boston
Satirical magazines published in the United States
Secret societies in the United States
Student magazines published in the United States
Student organizations established in 1876